"I Don't Wanna Talk It Over Anymore" is a single by American country music artist Connie Smith. Released in October 1976, the song reached #13 on the Billboard Hot Country Singles chart. The song was issued onto Smith's 1976 studio album that was released under the same name as the single. "I Don't Wanna Talk It Over Anymore" was Smith's final major hit single under Columbia Records.

Chart performance

References 

1976 singles
Connie Smith songs
Songs written by Eddy Raven
Song recordings produced by Ray Baker (music producer)
1976 songs
Columbia Records singles